The 2017–18 Little Rock Trojans men's basketball team represented the University of Arkansas at Little Rock during the 2017–18 NCAA Division I men's basketball season. The Trojans, led by second-year head coach Wes Flanigan, played their home games at the Jack Stephens Center in Little Rock, Arkansas as members of the Sun Belt Conference. They finished the season 7–25, 4–14 in Sun Belt play to finish in last place. They lost in the first round of the Sun Belt tournament to Appalachian State.

On March 9, 2018, the school fired head coach Wes Flanigan after just two seasons where he compiled a record of 22–42. On March 29, the school hired former NBA player Darrell Walker who had spent the last two seasons as head coach of Division II Clark Atlanta University.

Previous season
The Trojans finished the 2016–17 season 15–17, 6–12 in Sun Belt play to finish in tenth place. They lost in the first round of the Sun Belt tournament to Louisiana–Lafayette.

Roster

Schedule and results

 
|-
!colspan=9 style=| Exhibition

|-
!colspan=9 style=| Non-conference regular season

|-
!colspan=9 style=| Sun Belt Conference regular season

|-
!colspan=9 style=| Sun Belt tournament

References

Little Rock
Little Rock Trojans men's basketball seasons
Little Rock
Little Rock